Henry Cowan (5 December 1893 – 1974) was a Scottish footballer who played for Clyde and Dunfermline Athletic in his native country and for several clubs – primarily the New Bedford Whalers – in the United States, mainly as a full back. Reports from the time indicate that he was deaf and/or mute.

Career

Scotland
Raised in Eastfield, South Lanarkshire, Cowan began his known senior career with local club Clyde in 1916 (he was around 22 years old and it is likely he played for other clubs earlier, but this is unconfirmed). He was ever-present in his first season at Shawfield Stadium – 38 league appearances – and continued to feature regularly for the club throughout the duration of World War I (when many competitions were suspended but the Scottish Football League continued for public morale), suggesting that he was employed in a reserved occupation in addition to being a sportsman, although his later marriage and travel documentation listed him as a dyer outwith football so it may have been his hearing impairment which excused him from active service. A match report from October 1918 stated that Cowan "was again a dominating personality at pivot" in a victory over Hearts.

His eight years at Clyde also included reaching three finals of the Glasgow Cup, all ending in defeat (twice losing out to Celtic and once to Rangers after a replay, in which Cowan conceded a penalty kick for handball which resulted in the only goal). His spell at the club ended at the same time as their relegation from the top division in 1923–24, ending an 18-year run in the top division. A benefit match was played for him against Rangers in March 1924 to recognise his long service.

United States
Cowan moved on to Dunfermline Athletic for one season before heading to the United States, aged 31, to play in the American Soccer League.

Initially he was with the New Bedford Whalers, playing regularly for two seasons and winning the Lewis Cup in 1926. He then had short spells with other clubs: he began 1927–28 with the Hartford Americans before they were withdrawn from the league, then played a few matches each for the New York Nationals and the Fall River Marksmen – he was not involved in the later stages of the Nationals' winning run in the 1928 National Challenge Cup. In 1928–29 he played for J. & P. Coats who changed identity mid-season to become the Pawtucket Rangers. By now at the veteran stage, he returned to the Whalers in 1929 and played a handful of games for them, likely as an emergency stand-in, over the next two seasons, a somewhat chaotic period known as the 'soccer wars',  featuring several disputes, teams resigning and rival leagues being created, coinciding with the great depression which brought about the end of the system altogether a few years later.

Personal life
His son of the same name was born in Scotland but grew up in New Bedford and became an American citizen in order to serve in the US Air Force during World War II; he was killed in action in 1944.

Notes

References

1893 births
1974 deaths
Date of death missing
Scottish footballers
Sportspeople from Rutherglen
Association football defenders
Scottish emigrants to the United States
Deaf association football players
Scottish Football League players
American Soccer League (1921–1933) players
Clyde F.C. players
Dunfermline Athletic F.C. players
New Bedford Whalers players
Hartford Americans players
New York Nationals (ASL) players
Pawtucket Rangers players
Fall River Marksmen players
Scottish deaf people
Footballers from South Lanarkshire